Moven Enock Mahachi (13 June 1948 – 26 May 2001) served as the Minister of Defence of the Republic of Zimbabwe. He was a close ally of Robert Mugabe within Z.A.N.U.-P.F. Before becoming Defence Minister Mahachi served as M.P. for Makoni West.

Mahachi was killed on 26 May 2001 when his Land Rover Discovery collided with an Alfa Romeo sedan which cut the Land Rover off along the Mutare to Nyanga road. At the time Zimbabweans considered his death suspicious, especially as Mahachi died thirty days after another M.P., Border Gezi, was killed.

Mahachi was married and had four children at the time of his death. He was declared a national hero by the Government of Zimbabwe and was buried in the National Heroes Acre in Harare.

On 30 July 2009 Mahachi's predecessor, Enos Nkala, claimed that Mahachi was assassinated at the behest of Robert Mugabe because he opposed the looting of diamonds in the Democratic Republic of the Congo. In a statement he said:

In 2005 Mahachi was commemorated on Zimbabwean Post $50,000 stamp.

See also 

 Government of Zimbabwe 
 Parliament of Zimbabwe

References 

1948 births
2001 deaths
Zimbabwe African National Liberation Army personnel
Road incident deaths in Zimbabwe
ZANU–PF politicians
Defence Ministers of Zimbabwe